Werthmann is a German surname. Notable people with the surname include:

Angelika Werthmann (born 1963), Austrian politician
Lorenz Werthmann (1858–1921), German Roman Catholic priest and social worker
Martin Werthmann (born 1982), German artist

German-language surnames